Rock Township is an inactive township in Jefferson County, in the U.S. state of Missouri.

Rock Township was established in 1834, and named for the rocky terrain within its borders.

References

Townships in Missouri
Townships in Jefferson County, Missouri